Marieke van den Ham (born 21 January 1983 in Wierden, Overijssel) is a water polo player of the Netherlands who represents the Dutch national team in international competitions.

Van den Ham was part of the team that became 10th at the 2005 World Aquatics Championships in Montreal. At the 2006 FINA Women's Water Polo World League in Cosenza and the 2006 Women's European Water Polo Championship in Belgrade they finished in fifth place. She was not selected for the 2007 World Aquatics Championships in Melbourne, but returned for the Dutch team that finished in fifth place at the 2008 Women's European Water Polo Championship in Málaga and they qualified for the 2008 Summer Olympics in Beijing. There they ended up winning the gold medal on 21 August, beating the United States 9-8 in the final.

See also
 Netherlands women's Olympic water polo team records and statistics
 List of Olympic champions in women's water polo
 List of Olympic medalists in water polo (women)
 List of World Aquatics Championships medalists in water polo

References

External links
 

1983 births
Living people
People from Wierden
Dutch female water polo players
Water polo drivers
Left-handed water polo players
Water polo players at the 2008 Summer Olympics
Medalists at the 2008 Summer Olympics
Olympic gold medalists for the Netherlands in water polo
Sportspeople from Overijssel